Sturkie is an unincorporated community in northern Fulton County, Arkansas, United States. Sturkie has a post office with ZIP code 72578.

References

Unincorporated communities in Fulton County, Arkansas
Unincorporated communities in Arkansas